General Arie van der Vlis (20 August 1940 – 4 July 2020) was a Dutch military officer who served as Chief of the Defence Staff between 1992 and 1994.

His nephew was mass murderer Tristan van der Vlis.

References

External links 
 

1940 births
2020 deaths
Chiefs of the Defence Staff (Netherlands)